Paris Precinct is an American television series starring Claude Dauphin and Louis Jourdan that aired on ABC in 1955. Although set and shot in France, it was filmed in English. The stories were based on Surete files. Dauphin and Jourdan portrayed inspectors Bolbec and Beaumont, respectively. Episodes were 30 minutes long in black and white.

A production of Ziv Television Programs, the series was also known as World Crime Hunt.

References

External links
Paris Precinct at IMDb
Paris Precinct at Classic TV Archive
1955 American television series debuts
1955 American television series endings
1950s American television series
American Broadcasting Company original programming
Black-and-white television shows